Following is the complete list of mainstream and commercial media serving Fort Wayne, Indiana and its immediate suburbs.

Media

Newspapers

Television

Fort Wayne is the 107th-largest television market in the United States according to Nielsen Media Research.

Radio

The Fort Wayne radio market is the 107th-largest in the United States according to Arbitron. It includes radio stations licensed to Fort Wayne and its surrounding communities in Indiana and Ohio.

Internet
Below is a list of websites based in Fort Wayne along with genre, ownership, maintenance contact, and Alexa Traffic Rank. This rank is calculated using a combination of average daily visitors and page views over the past three months. The more visitors and views a site gets, the lower ranking number it receives. The site with the highest combination of visitors and page views is ranked #1.

References 

 
Fort Wayne
Indiana-related lists